Villa Maria or Villamaria may refer to:

Places
 Villa María, Argentina, a city in Córdoba, Argentina
 Villa de María del Río Seco, another town in Córdoba, Argentina
 Villamaría, Caldas, Colombia a town and municipality
 Villa Maria (Long Island), a landmark estate in Water Mill, New York
 Villa Maria, Pennsylvania, in Lawrence County
 Villa María, San José, a village in Uruguay
 Villa Maria, Uganda is a village in Kalungu District, Uganda
 Villa María del Triunfo, a district of Lima Province, Peru

Other uses
 Villa Maria is a former college in Erie, Pennsylvania
 Villa Maria (school), a girls' high school in Montreal
 Villa-Maria station, a metro station in Montreal
 Villa María station, a rapid transit station in Lima, Peru
 , a Croatian TV series produced by AVA Productions
 Villa Maria College, a college in Cheektowaga, New York
 Villa Maria College, Christchurch, New Zealand, a Roman Catholic girls' high school
 Villa Maria Estates, a wine company in New Zealand
 Villa Maria Hostel, a heritage-listed nursing home in Brisbane, Queensland, Australia

See also

 Vila Maria (disambiguation)
 
 Villa (disambiguation)
 Maria (disambiguation)
 Ville-Marie (disambiguation)
 Maryville (disambiguation)